Tlatoani ("one who speaks, ruler"; plural   or tlatoque) is the Classical Nahuatl term for the ruler of an , a pre-Hispanic state. It is the noun form of the verb "tlahtoa" meaning "speak, command, rule". As a result, it has been variously translated in English as "king", "ruler", or  "speaker" in the political sense. Above a tlahtoani is the Weyi Tlahtoani, sometimes translated as "Great Speaker", though more usually as "Emperor" (the term is often seen as the equivalent to the European "great king"). A  is a female ruler, or queen regnant.

The term  refers to "vice-leader".

The ruler's lands were called  , and the ruler's house was called  

The city-states of the Aztec Empire each had their own tlatoani, or leader. He would be the high priest and military leader for his city-state and would be considered its commander-in-chief. The tlatoani was the ultimate owner of all land in his city-state and received tribute, oversaw markets and temples, led the military, and resolved judicial disputes. He would often be a descendant of the royal family, but in some cases, he would be elected. Since the Tlatoani was allowed to have several wives, his legacy would be easily maintained. After being established as the tlatoani, he would be the tlatoani of his region for life. The tlatoani was chosen by a council of elders, nobles, and priests, which would select from a pool of four candidates.

Commanding hierarchy

The siwākōātl was the second in command after the tlatoani, was a member of the nobility, served as the supreme judge for the court system, appointed all lower court judges, and handled the financial affairs of the altepetl.

Tlatoani during times of war
During times of war, the tlatoani would be in charge of creating battle plans, and making strategies for his army. He would draft these plans after receiving information from various scouts, messengers, and spies who were sent out to an enemy āltepētl (city-state). Detailed information was presented to him from those reports to be able to construct a layout of the enemy. This was essential because this ensured the safety and success of each battle.

These layouts would be heavily detailed from city structures to surrounding area. The Tlatoani would be the most informed about any conflict and would be the primary decision maker during war. In modern terms, in the US, the Tlatoani would be the commander-in-chief, which is the president of the United States. The commander-in-chief is responsible for the armed forces or a military branch by exercising commands that must be followed.

He would also be in charge of gaining support from allied rulers by sending gifts and emissaries from his city-state. During warfare the tlatoani would be informed immediately of deaths and captures of his warriors. He would also be in charge of informing his citizens about fallen or captive warriors, and would present gifts to the successful ones.

Tlatoque of Tenochtitlan

There were eleven tlatoque of Tenochtitlan. Beginning with Itzcoatl, the tlahtoani of Tenochtitlan was also the hueyi tlahtoani of the Aztec Empire.
 Acamapichtli: 1376–1395
 Huitzilihuitl: 1395–1417
 Chimalpopoca: 1417–1427
 Itzcoatl: 1427–1440
 Moctezuma I: 1440–1469
 Axayacatl: 1469–1481
 Tizoc: 1481–1486
 Ahuitzotl: 1486–1502
 Moctezuma II: 1502–1520
 Cuitláhuac: 1520
 Cuauhtémoc: 1520–1521

See also
 Aztec Emperors family tree
 Aztec Empire
 List of Texcoco rulers
 List of Tlatelolco rulers
 Emperor

References

Sources

Further reading
 Carrasco, David. Daily Life of The Aztecs: People of the Sun and Earth. Connecticut: Greenwood Press, 1998.
 Sahagun, Bernardino de. Florentine Codex: General History of the Things of New Spain. Translated and edited by Arthur J. O. Anderson and Charles E. Dibble. 13 vols. Santa Fe: School of American Research, and University of Utah, 1950-1982.
 Somervill, Barbara A. Great Empires of the Past: Empire of the Aztecs. New York: Chelsa House, 2010.

 
 
Royalty in the Americas
Royal titles
Titles and offices of Native American leaders
Nahuatl words and phrases
Monarchy
Aztec Empire